The 2014–15 Brooklyn Nets season was the franchise's 48th season, its 39th season in the National Basketball Association (NBA), and its third season playing in the New York City borough of Brooklyn. The Nets finished the regular season with a 38–44 record, securing the eighth seed. In the playoffs, they met the top-seeded Atlanta Hawks in the First Round, losing in six games.

The Nets would not make another playoff appearance until the 2018–19 season.

Preseason

NBA Draft

Pre-season trades
On July 1, head coach Jason Kidd, was traded to the Milwaukee Bucks for two second-round draft picks in 2015 and 2019. To replace Kidd, the Nets signed Lionel Hollins as head coach. On July 10, the Nets traded Marcus Thornton to the Boston Celtics and the draft rights to Edin Bavčić and İlkan Karaman to the Cleveland Cavaliers, for Jarrett Jack and Sergey Karasev.

Regular season

Standings

Game log

Preseason

|- style="background:#cfc;"
| 1
| October 7
| Maccabi Tel Aviv
| 
| Brook Lopez (20)
| Mirza Teletović (8)
| Deron Williams (7)
| Barclays Center (15,915)
| 1–0
|- style="background:#cfc;"
| 2
| October 12
| @ Sacramento
|  
| Brook Lopez (18)
| Andrei Kirilenko (9)
| Deron Williams (6)
| Mercedes-Benz Arena (17,381)
| 2–0
|- style="background:#cfc;"
| 3
| October 15
| Sacramento
|  
| Mirza Teletović (22)
| Brook Lopez (6)
| Joe Johnson (8)
| MasterCard Center (17,130)
| 3–0
|- style="background:#fcc;"
| 4
| October 19
| Boston
| 
| Jarrett Jack (17)
| Mirza Teletović (6)
| Deron Williams (4)
| Barclays Center (13,787)
| 3–1
|- style="background:#cfc;"
| 5
| October 20
| Philadelphia
|  
| Mason Plumlee (20)
| Mason Plumlee (17)
| Jarrett Jack (8)
| Barclays Center (12,271)
| 4–1
|- style="background:#fcc;"
| 6
| October 22
| @ Boston
|  
| Mason Plumlee (15)
| Mason Plumlee (11)
| Jorge Gutiérrez (5)
| TD Garden (15,508)
| 4–2

Regular season

|-style="background:#fcc;"
| 1
| October 29
| @ Boston
|  
| Mirza Teletović (20)
| Joe Johnson (6)
| Deron Williams (8)
| TD Garden18,624
| 0–1

|- style="background:#cfc;"
| 2
| November 1
| @ Detroit
| 
| Joe Johnson (34)
| Kevin Garnett (14)
| Joe Johnson (6)
| The Palace of Auburn Hills19,904
| 1–1
|- style="background:#cfc;"
| 3
| November 3
| Oklahoma City
|  
| Brook Lopez (18)
| Mason Plumlee (8)
| Deron Williams (9)
| Barclays Center17,732
| 2–1
|-style="background:#fcc;"
| 4
| November 5
| Minnesota
|  
| Joe Johnson (22)
| Kevin Garnett (11)
| Deron Williams (6)
| Barclays Center16,302
| 2–2
|- style="background:#cfc;"
| 5
| November 7
| New York
|  
| Deron Williams (29)
| Brook Lopez (9)
| Deron Williams (6)
| Barclays Center17,732
| 3–2
|- style="background:#cfc;"
| 6
| November 9
| Orlando
| 
| Bojan Bogdanovic (22)
| Mason Plumlee (10)
| Williams & Garnett (7)
| Barclays Center16,127
| 4–2
|-style="background:#fcc;"
| 7
| November 12
| @ Phoenix
| 
| Joe Johnson (21)
| Kevin Garnett (10)
| Deron Williams (5)
| US Airways Center15,184
| 4–3
|-style="background:#fcc;"
| 8
| November 13
| @ Golden State
| 
| Jarrett Jack (23)
| Mason Plumlee (8)
| Deron Williams (5)
| Oracle Arena19,596
| 4–4
|-style="background:#fcc;"
| 9
| November 15
| @ Portland
| 
| Brook Lopez (21)
| Kevin Garnett (12)
| Deron Williams (6)
| Moda Center19,441
| 4–5
|-style="background:#fcc;"
| 10
| November 17
| Miami
| 
| Bojan Bogdanovic (22)
| Kevin Garnett (9)
| Deron Williams (7)
| Barclays Center17,732
| 4–6
|-style="background:#fcc;"
| 11
| November 19
| Milwaukee
|  
| Brook Lopez (26)
| Kevin Garnett (9)
| Joe Johnson (8)
| Barclays Center15,694
| 4–7
|-style="background:#cfc;"
| 12
| November 21
| @ Oklahoma City
|  
| Jarrett Jack (23)
| Brook Lopez (10)
| Jarrett Jack (5)
| Chesapeake Energy Arena18,203
| 5–7
|-style="background:#fcc;"
| 13
| November 22
| @ San Antonio
|  
| Deron Williams (24)
| Mirza Teletović (8)
| Deron Williams (7)
| AT&T Center18,581
| 5–8
|-
|-style="background:#cfc;"
| 14
| November 26
| @ Philadelphia
| 
| Joe Johnson (21)
| Kevin Garnett (9)
| Deron Williams (10)
| Wells Fargo Center11,223
| 6–8
|-style="background:#fcc;"
| 15
| November 30
| Chicago
| 
| Bojan Bogdanovic (13)
| Kevin Garnett (7)
| Jarrett Jack (4)
| Barclays Center17,732
| 6–9

|-style="background:#cfc;"
| 16
| December 2
| @ New York
| 
| Brook Lopez (23)
| Kevin Garnett (13)
| Joe Johnson (6)
| Madison Square Garden19,812
| 7–9
|-style="background:#cfc;"
| 17
| December 3
| San Antonio
| 
| Mirza Teletović (26)
| Brook Lopez (16)
| Deron Williams (9)
| Barclays Center15,989
| 8–9
|-style="background:#fcc;"
| 18
| December 5
| Atlanta
| 
| Brook Lopez (20)
| Lopez, Plumlee (7)
| Joe Johnson (4)
| Barclays Center16,146
| 8–10
|-style="background:#fcc;"
| 19
| December 8
| Cleveland
| 
| Kevin Garnett (14)
| Kevin Garnett (7)
| Deron Williams (11)
| Barclays Center17,732
| 8–11
|-style="background:#fcc;"
| 20
| December 10
| @ Chicago
| 
| Deron Williams (17)
| Mason Plumlee (8)
| Deron Williams (5)
| United Center21,646
| 8–12
|-style="background:#cfc;"
| 21
| December 12
| Philadelphia
| 
| Mason Plumlee (18)
| Kevin Garnett (12)
| Deron Williams (10)
| Barclays Center16,326
| 9–12
|-style="background:#cfc;"
| 22
| December 13
| @ Charlotte
| 
| Joe Johnson (22)
| Mason Plumlee (13)
| Deron Williams (10)
| Time Warner Cable Arena17,113
| 10–12
|-style="background:#fcc;"
| 23
| December 16
| Miami
| 
| Mason Plumlee (21)
| Kevin Garnett (10)
| Deron Williams (11) 
| Barclays Center16,827
| 10–13
|-style="background:#fcc;"
| 24
| December 17
| @ Toronto
| 
| Mason Plumlee (23)
| Plumlee, Johnson (8)
| Deron Williams (7)
| Air Canada Centre19,800
| 10–14
|-style="background:#fcc;"
| 25
| December 19
| @ Cleveland
| 
| Joe Johnson (26)
| Mason Plumlee (9)
| Johnson, Williams (4)
| Quicken Loans Arena20,562
| 10–15
|-style="background:#cfc;"
| 26
| December 21
| Detroit
|  
| Mason Plumlee (21)
| Mason Plumlee (12)
| Jarrett Jack (10)
| Barclays Center17,732
| 11–15
|-style="background:#cfc;"
| 27
| December 23
| Denver
|  
| Joe Johnson (27)
| Mason Plumlee (13)
| Jarrett Jack (8)
| Barclays Center17,080
| 12–15
|-style="background:#cfc;"
| 28
| December 26
| @ Boston
| 
| Jarrett Jack (27)
| Mason Plumlee (12)
| Jarrett Jack (5)
| TD Garden18,624
| 13–15
|-style="background:#fcc;"
| 29
| December 27
| Indiana
|  
| Jarrett Jack (22)
| Mason Plumlee (8)
| Joe Johnson (6)
| Barclays Center17,732
| 13–16
|-style="background:#cfc;"
| 30
| December 29
| Sacramento
| 
| Mason Plumlee (22)
| Kevin Garnett (8)
| Joe Johnson (6)
| Barclays Center17,732
| 14–16
|-style="background:#cfc;"
| 31
| December 30
| @ Chicago
| 
| Brook Lopez (29)
| Joe Johnson (11)
| Jarrett Jack (5)
| United Center22,032
| 15–16

|-style="background:#cfc;"
| 32
| January 2
| @ Orlando
|  
| Mason Plumlee (18)
| Mason Plumlee (9)
| Deron Williams (7) 
| Amway Center17,008
| 16–16
|-style="background:#fcc;"
| 33
| January 4
| @ Miami
| 
| Joe Johnson (19)
| Lopez, Garnett (29)
| Deron Williams (8)
| American Airlines Arena20,181
| 16–17
|-style="background:#fcc;"
| 34
| January 5
| Dallas
| 
| Brook Lopez (22)
| Brook Lopez (13)
| Jarrett Jack (10)
| Barclays Center17,732
| 16–18
|-style="background:#fcc;"
| 35
| January 7
| Boston
| 
| Joe Johnson (17)
| Mason Plumlee (12)
| Jarrett Jack (4)
| Barclays Center17,732
| 16–19
|-style="background:#fcc;"
| 36
| January 9
| Philadelphia
| 
| Brook Lopez (18)
| Mason Plumlee (15)
| Jarrett Jack (10)
| Barclays Center16,172
| 16–20
|-style="background:#fcc;"
| 37
| January 10
| @ Detroit
| 
| Joe Johnson (17)
| Brook Lopez (15)
| Jarrett Jack (8)
| The Palace of Auburn Hills19,301
| 16–21
|-style="background:#fcc;"
| 38
| January 12
| Houston
| 
| Mason Plumlee (24)
| Mason Plumlee (10)
| Jarrett Jack (6)
| Barclays Center16,115
| 16–22
|-style="background:#fcc;"
| 39
| January 14
| Memphis
| 
| Mason Plumlee (15)
| Mason Plumlee (9)
| Jarrett Jack (6) 
| Barclays Center16,516
| 16–23
|-style="background:#cfc;"
| 40
| January 16
| @ Washington
| 
| Lopez, Jack (26)
| Mason Plumlee (10)
| Jarrett Jack (7)  
| Verizon Center17,788
| 17–23
|-style="background:#fcc;"
| 41
| January 17
| Washington
| 
| Jarrett Jack (22)
| Kevin Garnett (10)
| Jarrett Jack (8)
| Barclays Center17,732
| 17–24
|-style="background:#cfc;"
| 42
| January 21
| @ Sacramento
|  
| Brook Lopez (22)
| Joe Johnson (8)
| Jarrett Jack (8)
| Sleep Train Arena16,427
| 18–24
|-style="background:#fcc;"
| 43
| January 22
| @ L.A. Clippers
| 
| Mason Plumlee (16)
| Jerome Jordan (11)
| Darius Morris (4)
| Staples Center19,060
| 18–25
|-style="background:#fcc;"
| 44
| January 24
| @ Utah
| 
| Jarrett Jack (16)
| Mason Plumlee (6)
| Jarrett Jack (8)
| EnergySolutions Arena19,352
| 18–26
|-style="background:#fcc;"
| 45
| January 28
| @ Atlanta
| 
| Joe Johnson (26)
| Lopez, Plumlee (7)
| Jarrett Jack (13)
| Philips Arena18,047
| 18–27
|-style="background:#fcc;"
| 46
| January 30
| Toronto
| 
| Lopez, Jack (35)
| Brook Lopez (12)
| Jarrett Jack (13) 
| Barclays Center17,062
| 18–28

|-style="background:#cfc;"
| 47
| February 2
| L.A. Clippers
| 
| Brook Lopez (24)
| Kevin Garnett (11)
| Jarrett Jack (7)  
| Barclays Center16,037
| 19–28
|-style="background:#cfc;"
| 48
| February 4
| @ Toronto
| 
| Jarrett Jack (24) 
| Mason Plumlee (7)
| Joe Johnson (7)
| Air Canada Centre19,800
| 20–28
|-style="background:#cfc;"
| 49
| February 6
| New York
| 
| Brook Lopez (22)
| Joe Johnson (11)
| Jarrett Jack (8) 
| Barclays Center17,732
| 21–28
|-style="background:#fcc;"
| 50
| February 7
| @ Washington
| 
| Brook Lopez (19)
| Brook Lopez (8)
| Deron Williams (7)
| Verizon Center17,732
| 21–29
|-style="background:#fcc;"
| 51
| February 9
| @ Milwaukee
| 
| Jarrett Jack (26) 
| Mason Plumlee (7)
| Jarrett Jack (8) 
| BMO Harris Bradley Center12,431
| 21–30
|-style="background:#fcc;"
| 52
| February 10
| @ Memphis
| 
| Plumlee, Anderson (15)
| Mason Plumlee (14)
| Williams, Johnson (4)
| FedExForum12,431
| 21–31
|- align="center"
| colspan="9" style="background:#bbcaff;" | All-Star Break
|-style="background:#cfc;"
| 53
| February 20
| @ L.A. Lakers
| 
| Joe Johnson (23)
| Brook Lopez (14)
| Deron Williams (15) 
| Staples Center18,997
| 22–31
|-style="background:#cfc;"
| 54
| February 23
| @ Denver
| 
| Brook Lopez (19)
| Markel Brown (11)
| Deron Williams (11) 
| Pepsi Center13,127
| 23–31
|-style="background:#fcc;"
| 55
| February 25
| @ New Orleans
| 
| Joe Johnson (21)
| Joe Johnson (10)
| Deron Williams (6) 
| Smoothie King Center16,097
| 23–32
|-style="background:#fcc;"
| 56
| February 27
| @ Houston
| 
| Plumlee, Williams (15)
| Brook Lopez (12)
| Joe Johnson (6)
| Toyota Center18,139
| 23–33
|-style="background:#cfc;"
| 57
| February 28
| @ Dallas
| 
| Deron Williams (25)
| Mason Plumlee (10)
| Anderson, Brown, Jack (4)
| American Airlines Center20,367
| 24–33

|-style="background:#cfc;"
| 58
| March 2
| Golden State
| 
| Brook Lopez (26)
| Mason Plumlee (7)
| Jarrett Jack (5) 
| Barclays Center17,732
| 25–33
|-style="background:#fcc;"
| 59
| March 4
| Charlotte
| 
| Deron Williams (12)
| Mason Plumlee (7) 
| Deron Williams (6)
| Barclays Center16,691
| 25–34
|-style="background:#fcc;"
| 60
| March 6
| Phoenix
| 
| Brook Lopez (19)
| Lopez, Jefferson (7)
| Deron Williams (7)
| Barclays Center16,445
| 25–35
|-style="background:#fcc;"
| 61
| March 8
| Utah
| 
| Lopez, Young (19)
| Brook Lopez (10)
| Johnson, Jack (5)
| Barclays Center17,041
| 25–36
|-style="background:#fcc;"
| 62
| March 10
| New Orleans
| 
| Lopez, Jack (15)
| Brook Lopez (9)
| Deron Williams (4)
| Barclays Center16,422
| 25–37
|-style="background:#fcc;"
| 63
| March 11
| @ Miami
| 
| Williams, Jack (18)
| Brook Lopez (14)
| Williams, Jack (4)
| American Airlines Arena19,600
| 25–38
|-style="background:#cfc;"
| 64
| March 14
| @ Philadelphia
| 
| Thaddeus Young (21)
| Thaddeus Young (9)
| Jarrett Jack (8)
| Wells Fargo Center14,865
| 26–38
|-style="background:#cfc;"
| 65
| March 16
| @ Minnesota
| 
| Joe Johnson (22)
| Mason Plumlee (9) 
| Deron Williams (7) 
| Target Center14,234
| 27–38
|-style="background:#fcc;"
| 66
| March 18
| @ Cleveland
| 
| Deron Williams (20) 
| Brook Lopez (8)
| Deron Williams (6) 
| Quicken Loans Arena20,562
| 27–39
|-style="background:#cfc;"
| 67
| March 20
| Milwaukee
| 
| Brook Lopez (32)
| Brook Lopez (18)
| J.Johnson, Jack (4)
| Barclays Center16,272
| 28–39
|-style="background:#cfc;"
| 68
| March 21
| @ Indiana
| 
| Brook Lopez (26)
| Thaddeus Young (7)
| Deron Williams (6) 
| Bankers Life Fieldhouse16,453
| 29–39
|-style="background:#fcc;"
| 69
| March 23
| Boston
| 
| Brook Lopez (31)
| Williams, Young (7)
| Deron Williams (10)  
| Barclays Center16,814
| 29–40
|-style="background:#cfc;"
| 70
| March 25
| @ Charlotte
| 
| Brook Lopez (34)
| Brook Lopez (10)
| Deron Williams (14)
| Time Warner Cable Arena15,091
| 30–40
|-style="background:#cfc;"
| 71
| March 27
| Cleveland
| 
| Johnson, Lopez (20)
| Brook Lopez (9)
| Joe Johnson (9)
| Barclays Center17,732
| 31–40
|-style="background:#cfc;"
| 72
| March 29
| L.A. Lakers
| 
| Brook Lopez (30)
| Brook Lopez (11)
| Deron Williams (9)
| Barclays Center17,732
| 32–40
|- style="background:#cfc;"
| 73
| March 31
| Indiana
| 
| Brook Lopez (24)
| Brook Lopez (11)
| Deron Williams (9) 
| Barclays Center16,756
| 33–40

|- style="background:#cfc;"
| 74
| April 1
| @ New York
| 
| Deron Williams (26) 
| Thaddeus Young (9)
| Deron Williams (7) 
| Madison Square Garden19,812
| 34–40
|-style="background:#cfc;"
| 75
| April 3
| Toronto
|  
| Deron Williams (31)
| Brook Lopez (17)
| Deron Williams (11)
| Barclays Center17,732
| 35–40
|-style="background:#fcc;"
| 76
| April 4
| @ Atlanta
| 
| Bojan Bogdanovic (19)
| Thaddeus Young (8)
| Jarrett Jack (6)  
| Philips Arena18,769
| 35–41
|-style="background:#cfc;"
| 77
| April 6
| Portland
| 
| Brook Lopez (32)
| Brook Lopez (9)
| Deron Williams (10) 
| Barclays Center17,416
| 36–41
|-style="background:#fcc;"
| 78
| April 8
| Atlanta
| 
| Brook Lopez (26)
| Thaddeus Young (11)
| Deron Williams (13)
| Barclays Center17,732
| 36–42
|-style="background:#cfc;"
| 79
| April 10
| Washington
| 
| Brook Lopez (26)
| Brook Lopez (9)
| Williams, Johnson (9) 
| Barclays Center17,732
| 37–42
|-style="background:#fcc;"
| 80
| April 12
| @ Milwaukee
| 
| Brook Lopez (12)
| Brook Lopez (10) 
| Deron Williams (7)
| BMO Harris Bradley Center16,504
| 37–43
|-style="background:#fcc;"
| 81
| April 13
| Chicago
| 
| Bojan Bogdanovic (17)
| Thaddeus Young (11)
| Deron Williams (5)
| Barclays Center17,732
| 37–44
|-style="background:#cfc;"
| 82
| April 15
| Orlando
| 
| Bojan Bogdanovic (28)
| Lopez, Johnson (7)
| Deron Williams (7)
| Barclays Center17,098
| 38–44

Playoffs

|- style="background:#fbb;"
| 1
| April 19
| @ Atlanta
| 
| Johnson, Lopez (17)
| Brook Lopez (14)
| Joe Johnson (6)
| Philips Arena18,440
| 0–1
|- style="background:#fbb;"
| 2
| April 22
| @ Atlanta
| 
| Jarrett Jack (23)
| Deron Williams (10)
| Deron Williams (8)
| Philips Arena18,207
| 0–2
|- style="background:#bfb;"
| 3
| April 25
| Atlanta
| 
| Brook Lopez (22)
| Brook Lopez (13)
| Jarrett Jack (8)
| Barclays Center17,732
| 1–2
|- style="background:#bfb;"
| 4
| April 27
| Atlanta
| 
| Deron Williams (35)
| Brook Lopez (10)
| Deron Williams (7)
| Barclays Center17,732
| 2–2
|- style="background:#fbb;"
| 5
| April 29
| @ Atlanta
| 
| Alan Anderson (23)
| Joe Johnson (9)
| Jack, Williams (6)
| Philips Arena18,105
| 2–3
|- style="background:#fbb;"
| 6
| May 1
| Atlanta
| 
| Brook Lopez (19)
| Jack, Lopez (7)
| Joe Johnson (6)
| Barclays Center17,732
| 2–4

Player statistics

Summer League

|-
| style="text-align:left;" | 
| 5
| 5
| 26.0
| .529
| .375
| .800
| 4.2
| 3.2
| 0.6
| 0.0
| 10.0
|- style="background:#f0f0f0;"
| style="text-align:left;" | 
| 3
| 0
| 11.7
| .200
| .000
| .000
| 2.0
| 0.3
| 0.7
| 1.7
| 0.7
|-
| style="text-align:left;" | 
| 2
| 0
| 8.5
| .333
| .000
| .000
| 1.5
| 0.0
| 1.0
| 0.0
| 1.0
|- style="background:#f0f0f0;"
| style="text-align:left;" | 
| 5
| 3
| 19.4
| .333
| .294
| 1.000
| 3.6
| 2.8
| 1.0
| 0.6
| 9.4
|-
| style="text-align:left;" | 
| 2
| 0
| 9.5
| .500
| .000
| 1.000
| 1.0
| 1.5
| 0.5
| 0.0
| 4.0
|- style="background:#f0f0f0;"
| style="text-align:left;" | 
| 5
| 2
| 21.4
| .700
| .000
| .875
| 6.8
| 0.2
| 1.4
| 1.6
| 11.2
|-
| style="text-align:left;" | 
| 5
| 0
| 15.8
| .462
| .308
| .857
| 1.8
| 1.2
| 0.6
| 0.0
| 6.8
|- style="background:#f0f0f0;"
| style="text-align:left;" | 
| 1
| 1
| 34.0
| .444
| .500
| .500
| 4.0
| 3.0
| 1.0
| 0.0
| 11.0
|-
| style="text-align:left;" | 
| 1
| 0
| 7.0
| .333
| .000
| .000
| 1.0
| 0.0
| 0.0
| 0.0
| 2.0
|- style="background:#f0f0f0;"
| style="text-align:left;" | 
| 4
| 0
| 8.5
| .357
| .714
| 1.000
| 1.0
| 0.3
| 0.0
| 0.8
| 4.8
|-
| style="text-align:left;" | 
| 1
| 0
| 10.0
| .000
| .000
| 1.000
| 1.0
| 0.0
| 0.0
| 0.0
| 2.0
|- style="background:#f0f0f0;"
| style="text-align:left;" | 
| 3
| 3
| 23.3
| .750
| .000
| .643
| 4.7
| 1.7
| 1.7
| 0.7
| 18.0
|-
| style="text-align:left;" | 
| 2
| 0
| 6.0
| .500
| .000
| 1.000
| 0.0
| 0.5
| 0.0
| 0.0
| 2.0
|- style="background:#f0f0f0;"
| style="text-align:left;" | 
| 0
| 0
| 0.0
| .000
| .000
| .000
| 0.0
| 0.0
| 0.0
| 0.0
| 0.0
|-
| style="text-align:left;" | 
| 5
| 4
| 20.6
| .367
| .222
| .923
| 4.0
| 0.6
| 0.6
| 0.2
| 10.4
|- style="background:#f0f0f0;"
| style="text-align:left;" | 
| 5
| 3
| 18.6
| .455
| .000
| .905
| 1.6
| 5.8
| 1.2
| 0.0
| 9.8
|-
| style="text-align:left;" | 
| 5
| 2
| 20.4
| .269
| .167
| .750
| 1.4
| 2.4
| 2.0
| 0.0
| 3.6
|- style="background:#f0f0f0;"
| style="text-align:left;" | 
| 3
| 2
| 17.7
| .360
| .333
| .875
| 3.3
| 2.0
| 0.7
| 0.0
| 9.0
|-
! Totals
! 5
! —
! —
! .446
! .312
! .842
! 32.4
! 20.2
! 10.0
! 4.4
! 87.4
|}

Source: NBA.com

Preseason

Injuries

Roster

Transactions

Trades

Free agents

Re-signed

Additions

Subtractions

Notes

See also

 2014–15 NBA season

References

External links

 2014–15 Brooklyn Nets preseason at ESPN
 2014–15 Brooklyn Nets regular season at ESPN
 2014–15 Brooklyn Nets postseason at ESPN

Brooklyn Nets season
Brooklyn Nets seasons
Brooklyn Nets
Brooklyn Nets
2010s in Brooklyn
Events in Brooklyn, New York
Prospect Heights, Brooklyn